Wasted may refer to:

Arts, entertainment, and media

Literature

Wasted: Tales of a GenX Drunk, a 1997 memoir by Mark Judge
Wasted: A Memoir of Anorexia and Bulimia, a 1998 autobiography by Marya Hornbacher
Wasted: A Childhood Stolen, An Innocence Betrayed, A Life Redeemed, a 2008 memoir by Mark Johnson

Music

EPs
Wasted (EP), by L.A. Guns

Songs
"Wasted" (Carrie Underwood song)
"Wasted" (Def Leppard song)
"Wasted" (Gucci Mane song)
"Wasted" (Jennifer Paige song)
"Wasted" (Juice Wrld song)
"Wasted" (Margaret song)
"Wasted" (Peking Duk song)
"Wasted" (Tiësto song)
"Wasted", by Ally Ryan
"Wasted", by And One
"Wasted", by Angus & Julia Stone from A Book Like This
"Wasted", by Anis Don Demina
"Wasted", by Black Flag from Nervous Breakdown
"Wasted", by Blancmange from Happy Families
"Wasted", by Cartel from Cartel
"Wasted", by Circle Jerks from Group Sex
"Wasted", by Demi Lovato from Holy Fvck
"Wasted", by Digga D
"Wasted", by Don Toliver from Heaven or Hell
"Wasted", by E-40 from The Block Brochure: Welcome to the Soil 3
"Wasted", by Earshot from The Silver Lining
"Wasted", by Goldfinger from Disconnection Notice
"Wasted", by Kasabian from For Crying Out Loud
"Wasted", by Lil Wayne from No Ceilings
"Wasted", by LP
"Wasted", by Mazzy Star from So Tonight That I Might See
"Wasted", by the Outfield from Any Time Now
"Wasted", by The Runaways from Waitin' for the Night
"Wasted", by Stabbing Westward from Stabbing Westward
"Wasted", by Suicide Silence from No Time to Bleed
"Wasted", by Travis Scott from Rodeo

Television
Wa$ted! (New Zealand TV series), a 2007 New Zealand reality television series
Wa$ted! (U.S. TV series), a 2008 American reality television series
Wasted (UK TV series), a 2016 British comedy television series

Other arts, entertainment, and media
Wasted (comics), a comic book by Gerry Alanguilan
"Wasted", a message that appears on Grand Theft Auto games (except Grand Theft Auto IV) when a protagonist dies
Wasted!, a 1996 Dutch film

Medicine
a word for weighing much less than normal for one's height due to malnutrition

Slang
A slang word qualifying a person in various states of substance intoxication

See also
 Waste (disambiguation)
Wasting, a disease of losing fat and tissue
Wasted Time (disambiguation)
Monique Wadsted (born 1959), Swedish lawyer